Ulothrix is a genus of green algae in the family Ulotrichaceae.

Ulothrix is a genus of non-branching filamentous green algae, generally found in fresh and marine water. Its cells are normally as broad as they are long, and they thrive in the low temperatures of spring and winter. They become attached to surfaces by a modified holdfast cell. Reproduction is normally vegetative. They are Eukaryotic and multicellular because the cells have specific functions as the lowermost cell serves as holdfast and it doesn't have chloroplast, and the apical cell is dome-shaped. 

The genus includes:

 Ulothrix aequalis Kützing
 Ulothrix moniliformis Kützing
 Ulothrix flacca (Dillwyn) Thuret in Le Jolis
 Ulothrix implexa (Kützing) Kützing
 Ulothrix speciosa (Carmichael ex Harvey in Hooker) Kützing
 Ulothrix tenerrima Kützing
 Ulothrix tenuissima Kützing
 Ulothrix zonata (Weber et Mohr) Kützing

Structure 

The plant body consists of unbranched, uniseriate filaments. The cells of the filaments are arranged end to end. They are cylindrical or barrel-shaped. The apical cell is somewhat rounded at its terminal end whereas the basal cell is elongated. It is also called the basal holdfast, which attaches the filament to the substratum. The cell wall is composed of propectin and cellulose and it lacks mucilage. Each cell has a single girdle-like and parietal chloroplast and two to many pyrenoids are present in each chloroplast

Reproduction 
Reproduction in Ulothrix takes place by means of vegetative, accidental breaking of the filament asexual and sexual methods.

Vegetative reproduction 
The common vegetative methods of reproduction are fragmentation and akinete formation.

Fragmentation 
Vegetative cells of 'Ulothrix' break into small pieces accidentally. Each fragment develops into a new filament.

Akinete formation 
Some of the vegetative cells of Ulothrix are converted into thick walled akinetes. Food reserves are accumulated within the akinetes. When the conditions are favourable each akinete develops into a new plant.

References

Ulotrichaceae
Taxa named by Friedrich Traugott Kützing
Ulvophyceae genera